Belle Cole (1845 or 1853–1905) was a well-known American contralto opera singer.

Belle Cole was born Lucetta Belle Weaver to Philander Weaver and Mary Ruth Ann Harford, the ninth of eleven children.  She was married to J. Calvin Cole. She first achieved success while on a transcontinental tour of the United States with Theodore Thomas in 1883. She later sang in England, performing at The Crystal Palace and many other venues. In 1901, she toured Australia and in 1894 she performed in several New Zealand cities.

References

External links
 A poster of Belle Colle in the British Library collection

American contraltos
1845 births
1905 deaths